The light welterweight class in the boxing at the 1964 Summer Olympics competition was the fifth-lightest class.  Light welterweights were limited to those boxers weighing less than 63.5 kilograms. 35 boxers from 35 nations competed.

Medalists

Results

References

Sources

L